Regan Elizabeth Hartley (born 1990) is an American beauty pageant titleholder from Dover, New Hampshire. She was crowned Miss New Hampshire 2011 and represented her state in the Miss America 2012 pageant with an anti-bullying platform. Hartley has joined forces with nhbullywatch.org and helped to pass a bill through the New Hampshire state house to protect kids against bullying in schools. She was named as 1st runner-up for the Quality of Life Award at the Miss America 2012 pageant.

References

External links
 
 

1990 births
Living people
American beauty pageant winners
Miss America 2012 delegates
People from Dover, New Hampshire
Suffolk University alumni